Pierre William (born 17 December 1928) is a French former athlete. He competed in the men's triple jump at the 1960 Summer Olympics.

References

External links
 

1928 births
Possibly living people
Athletes (track and field) at the 1960 Summer Olympics
French male triple jumpers
Olympic athletes of France
Sportspeople from Dakar